Towneley railway station was a station in Lancashire which served Burnley Wood and the nearby Towneley Hall on the eastern edge of Burnley. Opened on 12 November 1849 by the Lancashire and Yorkshire Railway, it was served by local trains on the Todmorden to Burnley line until closure by British Railways London Midland Region on 4 August 1952. The station house survives as a private residence, whilst the signal box remains in use to supervise a busy level crossing next to the former station site.

References

Disused railway stations in Burnley
Former Lancashire and Yorkshire Railway stations
Railway stations in Great Britain opened in 1849
Railway stations in Great Britain closed in 1952
1849 establishments in England